Kirkby Lonsdale railway station was located in Lancashire, England, on the Ingleton Branch Line,  from the town of Kirkby Lonsdale in Westmorland (now in Cumbria).

History
By the time the branch was completed in 1861, the L&CR was operated by the London and North Western Railway (L&NWR).

After formal closure to passenger on 1 February 1954, the line was still on occasions used for weekend excursions and to transport pupils to and from local boarding schools. Goods traffic continued until 1 October 1964. The line was maintained as a possible relief route until April 1967 when the tracks were lifted. The station had a goods shed, weighing machine and cattle pens. The station building survives as a private dwelling.

References
Notes

Sources

 Butt, R.V.J. (1995). The Directory Of Railway Stations. Patrick Stephens Limited. .
 Western, Robert (1990). The Ingleton Branch. Oxford : Oakwood Press.

External links
 The Lune Valley Railway
 Old Cumbrian Gazetteer

Disused railway stations in Lancaster
Railway stations in Great Britain opened in 1861
Railway stations in Great Britain closed in 1954
Former Lancaster and Carlisle Railway stations
1861 establishments in England